Don Craig Wiley (October 21, 1944 –  November 15, 2001) was an American structural biologist.

Education
Wiley received his doctoral degree in biophysics in 1971 from Harvard University, where he worked under the direction of the subsequent 1976 chemistry Nobel Prize winner William N. Lipscomb, Jr.
There, Wiley did early work on the structure of aspartate carbamoyltransferase, the largest molecular structure determined at that time. Noteworthy in this effort was that Wiley managed to grow crystals of aspartate carbamoyltransferase suitable for obtaining its X-ray structure, a particularly difficult task in the case of this molecular complex.

Career and research
Wiley was world-renowned for finding new ways to help the human immune system battle such viral scourges as smallpox, influenza, HIV/AIDS and herpes simplex.

Famous quote: "I'm sorry, but I just don't understand anything in biology unless I know what it looks like."

Awards and honors
In 1990, he was awarded the Louisa Gross Horwitz Prize from Columbia University. His research was honored with the 1993 Cancer Research Institute William B. Coley Award. Harvard called Wiley "one of the most influential biologists of his generation." In 1999, Wiley and another Harvard professor, Jack L. Strominger, won the Japan Prize for their discoveries of how the immune system protects humans from infections.

Personal life
Wiley owned a British racing green-colored Aston Martin.

He was a member of the American Academy of Arts and Sciences, the National Academy of Sciences, and the American Philosophical Society.

Don Wiley disappeared on November 15, 2001. Shelby County Medical Examiner, Dr. O. C. Smith, conducted the investigation into Mr. Wiley's death. Dr. Smith was quoted by a Boston Magazine article by Doug Most, which states: "Of all the measurements Smith took, one stood out: 8 inches. That’s how narrow the curb is from the road to the railing, which is only 43 inches high. 'If he stood against the rail, it’s hitting him in the back of the thigh,' Smith says. 'If he’s startled or caught by a gust from an 18-wheeler, his center of gravity is 47 inches, near the top rail, below his hip.'" A 43" rail hitting a person in the back of the thigh would require a person to have an inseam of 41-44 inches. An inseam of 40 inches is recommended for persons 6' 11" to over 7' tall.

See also
List of solved missing person cases
List of unsolved deaths

References

1944 births
2000s missing person cases
2001 deaths
Accidental deaths in Tennessee
American immunologists
Deaths by drowning in the United States
Harvard Graduate School of Arts and Sciences alumni
HIV/AIDS researchers
Members of the American Philosophical Society
Missing person cases in Tennessee
People with epilepsy
Recipients of the Albert Lasker Award for Basic Medical Research
Tufts University alumni
Unsolved deaths in the United States